Abdullah Mohammed Al-Khaibari (born 16 August 1996) is a Saudi Arabian football player who currently plays as a midfielder for Al-Nassr.

In May 2018 he was named in Saudi Arabia's preliminary squad for the 2018 World Cup in Russia.

Career statistics

Club

International
Statistics accurate as of match played 1 February 2022.

Honours

Club
Al-Nassr
 Saudi Professional League: 2018–19
 Saudi Super Cup: 2019, 2020

References

External links

Living people
1996 births
Association football midfielders
Saudi Arabian footballers
Al-Shabab FC (Riyadh) players
Al Nassr FC players
Place of birth missing (living people)
Saudi Professional League players
2018 FIFA World Cup players
Saudi Arabia youth international footballers
Saudi Arabia international footballers